The Communauté de communes des Vosges côté Sud-Ouest is an administrative association of rural communes in the Vosges department of eastern France. It was created on 1 January 2017 by the merger of the former Communauté de communes des Marches de Lorraine, Communauté de communes du Pays de la Saône Vosgienne, Communauté de communes du Pays de Saône et Madon and the commune Grandrupt-de-Bains. It has its administrative offices at Darney. Its area is 693.6 km2, and its population was 11,923 in 2019.

Composition
The communauté de communes consists of the following 60 communes:

Ainvelle
Ameuvelle
Attigny
Belmont-lès-Darney
Belrupt
Bleurville
Blevaincourt
Bonvillet
Châtillon-sur-Saône
Claudon
Damblain
Darney
Dombasle-devant-Darney
Dombrot-le-Sec
Dommartin-lès-Vallois
Escles
Esley
Fignévelle
Fouchécourt
Frain
Frénois
Gignéville
Godoncourt
Grandrupt-de-Bains
Grignoncourt
Hennezel
Isches
Jésonville
Lamarche
Lerrain
Lignéville
Lironcourt
Marey
Martigny-les-Bains
Martinvelle
Monthureux-sur-Saône
Mont-lès-Lamarche
Morizécourt
Nonville
Pont-lès-Bonfays
Provenchères-lès-Darney
Regnévelle
Relanges
Robécourt
Romain-aux-Bois
Rozières-sur-Mouzon
Saint-Baslemont
Saint-Julien
Sans-Vallois
Senaide
Senonges
Serécourt
Serocourt
Les Thons
Tignécourt
Tollaincourt
Les Vallois
Villotte
Vioménil
Viviers-le-Gras

References

Vosges cote Sud-Ouest
Vosges cote Sud-Ouest